Endurance (or stamina) is the act of sustaining prolonged stressful effort.

Endurance may also refer to:

Entertainment and media 
Endurance (TV series), an American Survivor-style reality TV show for teens
Endurance (Japanese TV series), a 1980s Japanese TV game show for students
Endurance: A Year in Space, a Lifetime of Discovery, a 2017 memoir by Scott Kelly
Endurance: Shackleton's Incredible Voyage, a 1959 book written by Alfred Lansing about the Imperial Trans-Antarctic Expedition
The Endurance: Shackleton's Legendary Antarctic Expedition, a 2000 documentary film about the Imperial Trans-Antarctic Expedition
Endurance (film), a 1999 film directed by Leslie Woodhead and Bud Greenspan
 Jacques Jams Vol 1: Endurance, a mixtape by the band Chester French

Vehicles 
ENDURANCE, NASA's Environmentally Non-Disturbing Under-ice Robotic ANtarctiC Explorer
Endurance (1912 ship), Ernest Shackleton's Antarctica vessel
HMS Endurance (1967), a British Royal Navy ice patrol vessel which played a part in the Falklands War
HMS Endurance (A171), a 1991 Royal Navy Antarctic-class 1A1 icebreaker
RSS Endurance, either of two ships of the Singapore Navy
Lordstown Endurance, a battery-electric pickup truck
Crew Dragon  Endurance (Dragon C210), a spacecraft built under NASA's Commercial Crew Program

Fictional vehicles
 Endurance, a NASA starship in the 2014  film Interstellar
Endurance (Star Wars), a fleet carrier in the Star Wars universe

Other uses 
Endurance (philosophy), a philosophical theory of persistence and identity
Endurance (crater), a Martian landmark visited by the rover Opportunity
Combat endurance
Endurance (aeronautics), the maximum length of time an aircraft can stay in flight

See also

Endurance race (disambiguation)
Endurance International Group, a web hosting company